A Guide to Groovy Lovin' is an album by DAG.

Track listing
 "Sweet Little Lass" – 	4:42
 "Our Love Would Be Much Better (If I Gave A Damn About You)" – 	3:42
 "Righteous" – 	3:38
 "You Make Me Feel" – 	4:30
 "Lovely Jane" – 	4:48
 "Supercollider" – 	3:54

References

	

DAG (band) albums
1998 albums